Amélie Diéterle (20 February 1871 – 20 January 1941) was a French actress and opera singer. She was one of the popular actresses of the Belle Époque until the beginning of the Années Folles. Amélie Diéterle inspired the poets Léon Dierx and Stéphane Mallarmé and the painters Auguste Renoir, Henri de Toulouse-Lautrec and Alfred Philippe Roll.

Biography
Amélie Diéterle was born in Strasbourg on 20 February 1871. She was the daughter of a maidservant from Munich and a young French officer, Captain Louis Laurent who was garrisoned nearby in 1870.

Having won first prize of song and solfège at the Conservatory of Dijon, she went to Paris in 1889 where she was chosen from 40 competitors to enter the Concerts Colonne. She was a pupil of Alice Ducasse who had been a singer of the Opéra-Comique. She was spotted in 1891 by the conductor of the Théâtre des Variétés and presented to the director Eugène Bertrand who hired her. This began a career of nearly 35 years in the troupe of the Variety Theatre. She became a permanent actress who had her own rooms and reserved box.

Her little voice flutée and her nose " trumpet " make her very popular and very appreciated.
She became the protégé of art collector Paul Gallimard, who was also the owner of the Variety Theater. She also inspired poets Léon Dierx and Stéphane Mallarmé.

Auguste Renoir made three portraits of her, a lithograph in gray on wove paper in 1899, exhibited at the Art Institute of Chicago Museum and a pastel in 1903, exhibited at the Museum of Fine Arts of Boston.

The two paintings depict Amélie Diéterle wearing a white hat.

One of the three works was loaned in 1922 by Gaston Bernheim (1870–1953) to the exhibition A Hundred Years of French Painting (1821–1921) from Ingres to Cubism, organized for the benefit of the Strasbourg Museum (hometown of the actress) at the Parisian headquarters of the Antiquarian Room (reproduced in the article by Léandre Vaillat in 'L'Illustration n° 4136 of 1er April 1922).

Henri de Toulouse-Lautrec makes it appear in one of his most famous paintings dated 1896: Marcelle Lender dancing bolero in Chilperic.

This painting is donated by Mrs. Henriette Roll at the Museum of Fine Arts of the City of Paris, at the Petit Palais.

It has achieved great notoriety as is still reflected today the many postcards of the 1900s that represent it.

She lived for a long time in the city of Croissy-sur-Seine.

Compromise in spite of herself in the affair of the traffic of the fake Rodin statues in 1919 and tired by thirty years in the spotlight, she withdraws progressively from the scene between 1920 and 1923.

On 16 June 1930, she married a friend of the family, André Louis Simon (1877–1965), in Vallauris.

Amélie Diéterle took refuge in Vallauris after June 1940 and died in Cannes after a long illness on 20 January 1941, at the age of 70 years.

Distinctions
Amélie Diéterle Appointed Officer of Public Instruction 20 January 1908.

Gallery

Theater

 1892: La Vie parisienne, opera in four acts by Henri Meilhac and Ludovic Halévy, music by Jacques Offenbach, Théâtre des Variétés. Role : Louise
 1892: Two against one, comedy in one act, by Debelly, Théâtre des Variétés
 1892: Remorse of Gideon, comedy in one act, by Marc Sonal and Victor Gréhon, Theater of Variety. Role : Hermance
 1892: La Souricière, comedy in three acts, by Alexandre Bisson and Albert Carré, Théâtre des Variétés. Role : Charlotte
 1893: Les brigands, opera in three acts, by Henri Meilhac and Ludovic Halévy, music by Jacques Offenbach, Théâtre des Variétés . Role : Zerlina
 1893: Modes à latresol, vaudeville by Marc Sonal and Victor Gréhon, Théâtre des Variétés. Role : Virginia
 1894: The Heroic The Cardunois, play in three acts, of Alexandre Bisson, theater of the Varieties. Role : Rosalie
 1894: Gentil Bernard or the Art of Love, a five-act comedy mixed with verses, by Philippe Dumanoir (Philippe-François Pinel, says) and Clairville (Louis-François-Marie Nicolai, says), Variety Theater. Role : Manon
 1894: Madame la Commissaire, vaudeville in three acts, from Henri Chivot and Henry Bocage (Henry Tousez, says), Théâtre des Variétés. Role : Louisette
 1894: The First husband of France, vaudeville in three acts, of Albin Valabrègue, theater of Variety. Role : Clara
 1894: La Glissade, comedy in three acts, by Max Maurey (Marx Rapoport, says) and Augustin Thierry (son of Gilbert Augustin-Thierry), Comédie-Parisienne Theater. Role : Julie
 1894: Mam'zelle Nitouche, play in four acts, by Henri Meilhac and Albert Millaud, music by Hervé (Louis -Auguste-Florimond Ronger, says), Variety Theater. Role : Lydie
 1894: La Rieuse, a three-act play by Ernest Blum and Raoul Toché, music by Hervé (Louis-Auguste-Florimond Ronger, said), Variety Theater. Role : Lise
 1895: The Diary of the Devil, a fantastic piece in five acts and eight tableaux by Ernest Blum and Paul Ferrier, music by Gaston Serpette, theater varieties. Role : Hyacinth
 1895: Chilperic, opera eaten in three acts and four tableaux, by Hervé (Louis-Auguste-Florimond Ronger, says) and Paul Ferrier, music by Hervé, Variety Theater. Role : Hennengarde
 1896: The Punctured Eye, opera in three acts, by Hervé (Louis-Auguste-Florimond Ronger, says), theater of varieties. Role : Éclosine
 1897: Paris qui marche, revue in 3 acts, 10 paintings, by Hector Monréal and Henri Blondeau , music of Henri Chatau (which composes especially for this review, the famous song, Frou-frou), theater of the Varieties. Roles : Raphaëlle, A little lady, A lady of the Restoration, Bengaline.
 1898: Le Nouveau Jeu, a comedy in five acts and seven tableaux by Henri Lavedan, Théâtre des Variétés. Role : Riquiqui
 1899: Forward: Smart!, Fantasy (revue) by Jules Oudot and Henry de Gorsse, cabaret of songwriters: Tréteau de Tabarin at 58 rue Pigalle. Role : the Divette
 1900: Between court and garden, fantasy-revue in one act of Émile Duranthon and Paul Delay, théâtre des Mathurins. Role : The Commere
 1900: Mignardise, fantasy in one act, by Michel Carré son and Frédéric Febvre, music by Francis Thomé, Capucine Theater. Role : Mignardise
 1900: Prince's Education, a four-act play by Maurice Donnay, at the Théâtre des Variétés. Role : Mariette Spring
 1900:  Les brigands (reprise), opéra in three acts, by Henri Meilhac and Ludovic Halévy, music of Jacques Offenbach, Variety Theater. Role : Duke of Mantua
 1900: La belle Hélène (reprise), opera in three acts by Henri Meilhac and Ludovic Halévy, music by Jacques Offenbach, Théâtre des Variétés. Role : Oreste
 1900: Le carnet du Diable (reprise), faerie-operetta in three acts and ten tableaux by Ernest Blum and Paul Ferrier, music of Gaston Serpette, Variety Theater. Role : Sataniella
 1901: Napoli, four-act ballet in Paul Milliet, music by Franco Alfano, staging and choreography by Mrs Mariquita (Marie-Thérèse Gamalery, so-called), under the direction of Édouard Marchand, theater director of the Folies Bergère. Role : La Parisienne
 1901: The Works of Hercules, Opera in 3 acts of Gaston Arman de Caillavet and Robert de Flers, music of Claude Terrasse, Bouffes-Parisiens theater. Role : the queen Omphale
 1901: Lili and Tonton, a play by Léon Jancey at the Mathurins Theater. Role : Julie de Vimeuse
 1902: Madame la Présidente, operetta in 3 acts, by Paul Ferrier and Auguste Germain, music by Edmond Diet, bouffes-Parisians. Role : Reseda.
 1903: La Revue à poivre, reviewed in eight tableaux by E.P. Lafargue at La Scala. Role : Beguinette
 1904: Mam'zelle 5 Louis or Mam'zelle Five Louis, fantasy-operetta in three acts and five tableaux by Armand Tillet says Claude Roland and Hippolyte Gaetan Chapoton said Serge Basset, music of Louis Bernard-Saraz said Ludovic Ratz, Café-concert Parisiana. Role : Mam'zelle Five Louis
 1905: La Petite Milliardaire by Henri Dumay
 1905: Heart of Sparrow, of Louis Artus, Theater of the Athenee
 1906: Le Paradis de Mahomet, an operetta in three acts and four tableaux by Henri Blondeau, music by Robert Planquette, Variety Theater. Role : Fathmé
 1906: La Ponette by Louis Artus
 1907: The Coup de Jarnac by Henry de Gorsse and Maurice de Marsan
 1907: Des Lys here and there, delight, revue in one act by Jean Meudrot and Paul Bail, Théâtre de la Comédie-Royale. Roles : Fleur de Lys and the Ecaillère and an imitation of Jacasse
 1907: Love in the bank, comedy in three acts of Louis Artus, theater of the Varieties. Role : Caroline
 1908: The King, comedy in four acts by Robert de Flers, Gaston Arman de Caillavet and Emmanuel Arène, theater varieties. Role : Suzette Bourdier
 1909: Crainquebille, a play in three tableaux by Anatole France, Théâtre du Châtelet. Role: a worker 
 1909: 24 October, 530e and last performance of the comedy, The King, at the Théâtre des Variétés.
 1909: Le Circuit, a three-act play by Georges Feydeau and Francis de Croisset, Théâtre des Variétés. Role : Gabrielle
 1910: At the time of the crusades, operetta by Franc-Nohain and Claude Terrasse, Palais de la Bourse, as part of the Feast of the Exchange Agent Company. Role : The chatelaine
 1910: Our Women, vaudeville in three acts by Pierre Filhol, Théâtre des Folies-Dramatiques. Role: Chichette
 1911: La Vie parisienne (reprise), opera in four acts by Henri Meilhac and Ludovic Halévy, music by Jacques Offenbach, Théâtre des Variétés. Role : Swedish Baroness
 1911: Les Midinettes, by Louis Artus
 1912: Happiness at the hand by Paul Gavault
 1917: Béguinette, Variety Theater
 1918: La Dame de Monte-Carlo by Georges Léglise and Edmond Pingrin, music by Germaine Raynal and Hubert Mouton, Théâtre des Variétés
 1919: I want to have a Child, Théâtre de l'Ambigu-Comique
 1921: The King, by Gaston Arman de Caillavet, Robert de Flers and Emmanuel Arène, Variety Theater. Role : Youyou
 1922: La Belle Angevine by Maurice Donnay and André Rivoire, Théâtre des Variétés.

Filmography 

 1909: Femme de chambre improvisée, by Georges Monca
 1909: Jim Blackwood jockey, by Georges Monca
 1909: The two burglars, by Georges Monca
 1909: The maker of Cremona, by Albert Capellani
 1909: The universal legatee, by André Calmettes
 1910: Mimi Pinson (or Miss Pinson), by Georges Monca. Role : Mimi Pinson
 1910: The Christmas of the Painter, by Georges Monca
 1910: The cicada and the ant by Georges Monca
 1910: The cat metamorphosed into a woman, by Michel Carré. Role: Kato
 1911: The living dead by Michel Carré
 1911: The rival duped, by Michel Carré. Role: The bride
 1911: Rigadin burglar, by Georges Monca
 1911: Boubouroche, by Georges Monca
 1911: Rigadin and the recalcitrant tenant, by Georges Monca
 1911: The Nose of Rigadin, by Georges Monca
 1911: The Disadvantages of Rigadin, by Georges Monca
 1912:  Rigadin explorer, by Georges Monca
 1912: Rigadin and the aunt to the inheritance, by Georges Monca. Role : The aunt
 1912: The household of Rigadin, by Georges Monca
 1912: Rigadin and the recalcitrant divorcee, by Georges Monca
 1912: The three sultanas, by Adrien Caillard. Role : Roxelane
 1912: Rigadin between two flames, by Georges Monca
 1912: Rigadin in the Balkans, by Georges Monca
 1913: The vengeful fire, by Georges Monca. Role : Countess of Grandchamp

Bibliography

References

External links 

 
 

1871 births
1941 deaths
Actors from Strasbourg
19th-century French actresses
20th-century French actresses
French stage actresses
French silent film actresses
Women film pioneers
Belle Époque
Musicians from Strasbourg